Candidula lernaea is a species of air-breathing land snail, a terrestrial pulmonate gastropod mollusk in the family Geomitridae, the hairy snails and their allies.

References

 Hausdorf, B. (1991). Über zwei Candidula-Arten von der südlichen Balkanhalbinsel (Gastropoda: Hygromiidae). Archiv für Molluskenkunde, 120 (4/6): 119-129. Frankfurt am Main.
 Bank, R. A.; Neubert, E. (2017). Checklist of the land and freshwater Gastropoda of Europe. Last update: July 16th, 2017.

lernaea
Gastropods described in 1991